Thelymitra aristata, commonly called the great sun orchid, is a species of orchid that is endemic to south-eastern Australia. It has a single large, thick leaf and bracts and up to forty crowded blue or purplish flowers with darker veins.

Description
There are between three and five large bracts along the flowering stem. The lobe on the top of the anther is purplish brown with a finely-toothed yellow tip. The side lobes have dense, mop-like tufts of white hairs. The flowers are scented, insect-pollinated and open on sunny days. Flowering occurs from September to January.

Taxonomy and naming
Thelymitra aristata was first formally described in 1840 by John Lindley from a specimen collected in Tasmania and the description was published in his book The genera and species of Orchidaceous plants. The specific epithet (aristata) is a Latin word meaning "with ears".

Distribution and habitat
The great sun orchid grows in a wide range of habitats from swamp margins to open forest. It is found in New South Wales in coastal and near-coastal areas south of Fitzroy Falls, in the southern half of Victoria, in south-eastern South Australia and in Tasmania including King and Flinders Islands.

References

External links
 
 

aristata
Endemic orchids of Australia
Orchids of New South Wales
Orchids of Victoria (Australia)
Orchids of South Australia
Orchids of Tasmania
Plants described in 1840